Sir William Duff-Gordon, 2nd Baronet (8 April 1772 – 8 March 1823), known as William Gordon until 1815, was a Scottish politician.

Duff-Gordon was the son of the Hon. Alexander Gordon, Lord Rockville, son of William Gordon, 2nd Earl of Aberdeen. His mother was Anne, daughter of William Duff. He was returned to Parliament as one of two representatives for Worcester in 1807, a seat he held until 1818. In 1815, he succeeded his uncle Sir James Duff, 1st Baronet, as 2nd Baronet of Halkin according to a special remainder, and assumed the same year by Royal licence the additional surname of Duff.

Duff-Gordon married Caroline Cornewall, youngest daughter of Sir George Cornewall, on 5 February 1810. He died in March 1823, aged 50, and was succeeded in the baronetcy by his son Alexander.

Notes

References
Kidd, Charles, Williamson, David (editors). Debrett's Peerage and Baronetage (1990 edition). New York: St Martin's Press, 1990,

External links 
 

1772 births
1823 deaths
Duff-Gordon, Sir William, 2nd Baronet
Members of the Parliament of the United Kingdom for English constituencies
UK MPs 1807–1812
UK MPs 1812–1818